Maurice Barry may refer to:
 Maurice Barry (politician)
 Maurice Barry (gymnast)
 Maurice Barry (cinematographer)